It Is Useless to Resist Us: 25 Years of Information Society is a DVD by American electronic band Information Society. It contains the recording of a concert filmed at the Trocadero Theatre in Philadelphia, on January 5, 2008, as well as five of their older music videos. The disc also included the EP Modulator in MP3 format.

The audio of the same concert was later remastered and released as a live album under the title It Is Useless to Resist Us: Information Society Live.

The title refers to a line from Star Trek, that Information Society had sampled in their 1988 song "Walking Away".

Track listing
 "Peace and Love, Inc."
 "Wrongful Death"
 "The Seeds of Pain"
 "Walking Away"
 "Baby Just Wants"
 "Burning Bridges"
 "Think"
 "Jonestown"
 "Growing Up with Shiva"
 "I Like the Way You Werk It"
 "Run Away"
 "Back in the Day"
 "Running"
 "Are Friends' Electric?"
 "What's on Your Mind?"

 Studio videos (DVD release only)
 "What's on Your Mind?"
 "Walking Away"
 "Think"
 "Repetition"
 "Peace and Love, Inc."

2009 video albums
2013 live albums
Information Society (band) albums